Gary Webb (born July 17, 1961) is an American professional golfer who played on the Nationwide Tour.

Webb was born in Pampa, Texas. He played college golf at the University of Texas at Austin. He turned pro in 1984.

Webb joined the Nationwide Tour in 1991 and recorded four top-10 finishes in his rookie year. He only played in 15 events from 1992 to 1995 but finished in a tie for second at the Nike Dakota Dunes Open in 1994. Two years later he picked up his first win on Tour in a playoff at the Nike Dakota Dunes Open. He picked up his second victory at the Nike Fort Smith Classic in 1999. His last full season on the Nationwide Tour came in 2000 and he played in his last event on Tour in 2003.

Professional wins (4)

Nike Tour wins (2)

Nike Tour playoff record (1–0)

Asia Golf Circuit wins (2)
1993 Indonesia Open
1995 Hong Kong Open

External links

American male golfers
Texas Longhorns men's golfers
PGA Tour golfers
Golfers from Texas
People from Pampa, Texas
1961 births
Living people